Ocran may refer to:

Ocran (biblical figure)
Ocran, Virginia
Ocran (surname)